Demopsestis punctigera is a moth in the family Drepanidae. It was described by Arthur Gardiner Butler in 1885. It is found in Japan, Korea and the Chinese provinces of  Jilin, Shaanxi and Jiangsu.

The wingspan is 33–40 mm.

References

Moths described in 1885
Thyatirinae